This is a list of Tamil language films produced in the Tamil cinema in India that have been released or schedule to release in 2021.

Box office collection
The highest-grossing Kollywood films released in 2021, by worldwide box office gross revenue, are as follows:

January – March

April – June

July – September

October – December

Dubbed Films

References

External links 

Tamil
2021
Tamil